Robert Rogers (after 1650 – 1717) was an Irish politician.  He sat in the House of Commons of Ireland as a Member of Parliament (MP) for Cork City from 1692 to 1699.

References 

1650 births
Year of birth uncertain
1719 deaths
Members of the Parliament of Ireland (pre-1801) for Cork City
Irish MPs 1692–1693
Irish MPs 1695–1699